Ashirate, sometimes written Ashiret or Asherate, is a settlement and an administrative unit, known as a Union Council, of Chitral District in the Khyber Pakhtunkhwa province of Pakistan.  It lies in the south of the district, on the road to the Lowarai Pass and Dir.

The population speak the Palula language.

See also 

 Chitral District

References

External links
Khyber-Pakhtunkhwa Government website section on Lower Dir
United Nations

Chitral District
Tehsils of Chitral District
Populated places in Chitral District
Union councils of Chitral District